Levan Davitashvili is a Georgian Politician who is serving as Vice Prime Minister of Georgia from July 2021 and Minister of Economy. He previously served as the Minister of Enviromental Protection and Agriculture from 2016 to 2022.

Career 
From December 2017 to September 2022, he was Minister of Environmental Protection and Agriculture. On 9 February 2021, he became Minister of Economy and Sustainable Development. In July 2021 he was appointed as Vice Prime Minister of Georgia.

References 

Living people
1978 births